Çukur is a Turkish psychological thriller television series directed by Sinan Öztürk, and written by Gökhan Horzum and Damla Serim. It premiered on 23 October 2017 and concluded on 7 June 2021 with a total of 131 episodes (four seasons).

Plot 
The control of Çukur, a district of Istanbul, identified with crime, is in the hands of the Koçovalı family. Although it is so closely related to crime, the family has its own rules. One of these rules is the drug ban. Drugs are not produced, used or sold in Çukur, but groups that are new to the game try to break the ban.

Filming 
Çukur was shot in Balat district in Fatih district of Istanbul. Some of the scenes in the first and second episode of the first season were shot in Paris, France, and some of the scenes of the third season were in Berlin, Germany.

Cast

Soundtracks

Series overview

International broadcasting 
  on Gem TV since 2019 as Godal (گودال). Dubbed in Persian language.
  on Kana TV since 2019 as የኛ ሰፈር
  on beIN Drama since 2019 as Alhufra (الحفرة). Dubbed in Arabic language.
 South Africa in  Eextra since 2022 as in Afrikaans as Die Put (english as The Pit)
  on Nova BH since 2022 as Jama
 Serbia on Nova S since 2021 as Jama (Only 1. seasion)
 Albania on TV Klan since November 2022

Bookmaking 
The screenwriter of the series, Gökhan Horzum, published a book about the first season of the series called Yamaç's Return – Çukur in October 2019.

Reviews 

Çukur has a story that reduces the neighborhood to a bad image (pit), unlike the Turkish TV series that deal with the neighborhood culture of the 2000s.  Nurdan Gürbilek devoted a separate section to the line in his work named Second Life and commented on "family, masculinity and mafia series".  In the series, the hero first leaves the house and then returns to the threatened neighborhood as a savior.  Gürbilek interprets this as a classic return story and evaluates a popular version of the "man returning home" narrative.  The soundtracks of the series that are integrated with the scenes of violence (predominantly Gazapizm and Eypio songs) are rap pieces that have been transformed into close combat music according to him.  In the series, the name of the struggle between heirs (self and stepchildren) created by the image of the father and the weakening of the father is "the fight of the brothers".  On the contrary, those under the command of Baba (İdris et al.) and the neighborhood leader (Yamaç et al.), who stand out as the savior and protector of the Gariban (neighborhood), are "fatherless children".  According to Gürbilek, the neighborhood is seen as a "liberated space" in the series, and the reality of despair connects people to the Fatherhood and masculinity order (neighborhood).

Complaints 
Since its publication, Çukur has been among the most complained works on TV.  RTÜK imposed administrative fines on the channel where the series was broadcast due to scenes of armed conflict, fear, violence and torture. Ercan Kesal, who took place in Çukur for two seasons, replied to the increasing complaints, "The issue of violence in Çukur is much more innocent when you compare it with the violence in daily life."

References

External links 
 Çukur on Show TV

2017 Turkish television series debuts
2021 Turkish television series endings
Turkish action television series
Turkish drama television series
Television series by Ay Yapım
Television shows set in Paris